The mayor of New York City is elected in early November every four years, in the year immediately following a United States presidential election year, and takes office at the beginning of the following year. The city, which elects the mayor as its chief executive, consists of the five boroughs (Manhattan, The Bronx, Brooklyn, Queens and Staten Island), which consolidated to form "Greater" New York on January 1, 1898.

The consolidated city's first mayor, Robert A. Van Wyck, was elected with other municipal officers in November 1897. Mayoral elections previously had been held since 1834 by the City of Brooklyn and the smaller, unconsolidated City of New York (Manhattan, later expanded into the Bronx).

Eric Adams took office 12:01 AM on January 1, 2022 at a private swearing-in,  followed by a public ceremony later in the day. He is the second Black mayor in the history of the city. He follows Bill de Blasio, who served two consecutive terms after being elected in 2013 and for a second term in 2017.

Overview

Scope of this article
The vast bulk of this page's contents is statistical: the main results, citywide and by borough, of each of the 32 elections to the Mayoralty of the City of New York since Greater New York was consolidated from the five boroughs in 1897-1898.

For many years, but not all, there are also results for minor candidates and for the different parties nominating the same major candidate. (Because minor parties' votes are not uniformly available, totals and thus percentages can be slightly inconsistent, either between different elections or between individual boroughs and the entire city in the same election.)

There are brief comments about some of the elections, and separate articles have been written for those of 1917, 1977, 1997, 2001, 2005, and 2009. Different elections are compared in many of the individual notes, in two summary tables and in one specialized table.

New York City's mayoral elections have been marked by an interplay of factors that are magnified by the size of the population. There was a history of a large socialist vote, there is a history of tension between 'regular' and 'reform' politicians, and there has been electoral fusion, a factor not seen in most of the rest of the United States, with a resulting plethora of smaller, yet influential, third parties.

Terms and term limits (since 1834)

Direct elections to the mayoralty of the unconsolidated City of New York began in 1834 for a term of one year, extended to two years after 1849. The 1897 Charter of the consolidated City stipulated that the mayor was to be elected for a single four-year term. In 1901, the term halved to two years, with no restrictions on reelection. In 1905, the term was extended to four years once again. (Mayors Fiorello La Guardia, Robert F. Wagner Jr. and Ed Koch were later able to serve for twelve years each.) In 1993, the voters approved a two-term (eight-year) limit, and reconfirmed this limit when the issue was submitted to referendum in 1996. In 2008, the New York City Council voted to change the two-term limit to three terms (without submitting the issue to the voters). Legal challenges to the Council's action were rejected by Federal courts in January and April, 2009. However, in 2010, yet another referendum, reverting the limit to two terms, passed overwhelmingly.

Principal source: The Encyclopedia of New York City (see Sources below), entries for "charter" and "mayoralty".
 See List of mayors of New York City.
 Mayor Strong, elected in 1894, served an extra year because no municipal election was held in 1896, in anticipation of the consolidated City's switch to odd-year elections.
 George B. McClellan Jr. was elected to one two-year term (1904–1905) and one four-year term (1906–1909)
 David Dinkins was not affected by the term limit enacted in 1993 because he had served only one term by 1993 and failed to win re-election.
 The September 11 attacks on the World Trade Center in Manhattan coincided with the primary elections for a successor to Mayor Giuliani, who was completing his second and final term of office. Many were so impressed by both the urgency of the situation and Giuliani's response that they wanted to keep him in office beyond December 31, 2001, either by removing the term limit or by extending his service for a few months. However, neither happened, the primary elections (with the same candidates) were re-run on September 25, the general election was held as scheduled on November 6, and Michael Bloomberg took office on the regularly appointed date of January 1, 2002.
 On October 2, 2008, Michael Bloomberg announced that he would ask the city council to extend the limit for mayor, council and other officers from two terms to three, and that, should such an extended limit prevail, he himself would seek re-election as mayor. On October 23, the New York City Council voted 29-22 to extend the two-term limit to three terms. (A proposed amendment to submit the vote to a public referendum had failed earlier the same day by a vote of 22–28 with one abstention.)
In November 2010, yet another popular referendum, limiting mayoral terms to two, passed overwhelmingly.

Interrupted terms

Mayors John T. Hoffman (1866–68, elected Governor 1868), William Havemeyer (1845–46, 1848–49, and 1873–74), William Jay Gaynor (1910–13), Jimmy Walker (1926–32), and William O'Dwyer (1946–50) failed to complete the final terms to which they were elected. The uncompleted mayoral terms of Hoffman, Walker, and O'Dwyer were added to the other offices elected in (respectively) 1868, 1932, and 1950 [those three elections are listed as "special" in the table below because they occurred before the next regularly scheduled mayoral election; the "regular" mayoral elections of 1874 and 1913, on the other hand, were held on the same day that they would have happened had the mayoralty not become vacant.]

† Became acting mayor as the president of the board of aldermen or (in 1950) city council.

(D) = (Democratic)

(R) = (Republican)

 Mayor Havemeyer was a Democrat who ran as a Republican against the Democratic Tweed Ring in 1872.
 Acting Mayors Coman, Vance and Kline did not seek election as mayor.
 Acting Mayors McKee and Impellitteri were Democrats who lost the Democratic primary to succeed themselves, but still ran in the general election as independents.
 Elected Mayor Oakey Hall won re-election, while Mayor Wickham did not seek it. Mayors Mitchel and O'Brien lost attempts at re-election, while Mayor Impellitteri did not run for a full term in the 1953 regular general election after losing the Democratic primary.

Summary tables

Principal candidates' city-wide vote since 1897

This chart has several purposes. One is to provide ordinary readers with simple, basic information from a very detailed page. Another is to provide a handy index for those looking for a particular candidate or campaign. (Just click on the year, the candidate's name, or the party name or abbreviation for more details.)

A slightly more sophisticated purpose is to sketch out on one screen the flow of votes across parties and candidates, as affected by fusion, splitting, cross-endorsement and the emergence of new movements or personalities.

Votes in thousands for principal candidates only, generally those winning more than 4.0% (1/25) of the total vote. (Therefore, low votes may not be shown in a particular year for an otherwise significant party, such as Socialist or Conservative. Total vote includes that for all candidates and parties, major and minor.

Winner in bold-face in a colored box. Sitting mayor (elected or acting) at the time of the election in italics.

To determine the meaning of abbreviations, click the link or check the list below this table. (Different first names, initials and nicknames may be used for the same person purely to fit the available space.)

Abbreviations used in this table: Fu. or Fus = Fusion, Ind. = Independent, Ind Fu. = Independent Fusion (1989), Independence or Indep'ce = Independence Party of New York, L or Lib. = Liberal Party of New York, Cons. = Conservative Party of New York, ALP = American Labor Party, Soc. = Socialist Party of America, Jeff'n D = The Democracy of Thomas Jefferson (Henry George, 1897), Civic All'ce = Civic Alliance (Hearst 1909), Exp = Experience party (Impellitteri's label for his independent campaign in 1950), Jobs & Educ. = Independent Jobs & Education party (Bloomberg's personal label sharing a ballot line with Independence Party in 2009)

How the boroughs voted

See the table above for more information about the candidates and parties involved. Blue indicates a candidate endorsed by the Democratic Party; pink one endorsed by the Republicans; and buff (or beige) one endorsed by neither party. (Darker shades indicate where a borough voted for a candidate who lost the citywide vote.) In 1981, Edward Koch ran on the tickets of both the Democrats and the Republicans.

Click a year to see the table or tables for that particular election (# indicates a link devoted to one specific election rather than to a set of two to six.)

Although separate boroughs since 1898, the Bronx and Manhattan shared New York County and reported elections together until the separate Bronx County was formed in April 1912 and started her separate existence on January 1, 1914. The borough of Richmond changed its name to Staten Island in 1975, although the co-extensive Richmond County still retains that name.

Although it was not uncommon for a candidate to carry all five boroughs in the same election, variations in voting patterns are noticeable. Since it started reporting separate returns in 1913, the Bronx has supported only one Republican (Fiorello La Guardia) and Manhattan has opposed only two successful candidates (Giuliani in 1993 and Bloomberg in 2001). On the other hand, in the eleven elections since 1965 that were contested between Democratic and Republican candidates (i.e. excluding 1981, when Ed Koch was endorsed by both parties),  Staten Island has voted for only two Democratic candidates, Abe Beame in 1973 and Koch in 1985. Queens has voted for only three, Abe Beame in 1973, Koch in 1985, and Bill de Blasio in 2017. The City as a whole elected four of the Democratic candidates in those same eleven elections from 1965 to 2009. The Bronx supported all eleven, Brooklyn nine, and Manhattan six.

Some basic patterns of mayoral elections in New York City

Democrats, Republicans, and reformers
One pattern, stretching back well before consolidation and lasting into the 1960s, is the conflict between, on one side, Tammany Hall, the Democratic political organization largely built on political patronage with a consequent deep skepticism about Civil Service, the merit system of assigning government jobs, and competitive bidding for city contracts, and on the other hand, its various opponents, including Republicans, businessmen opposed to taxation or extorted bribes, middle-class reformers and labor union activists.

Until the election of Fiorello H. La Guardia in 1933, it was almost never possible to unite the disparate anti-Tammany elements in a coalition strong enough to prevail for more than one election. (This was not only for negative reasons: Tammany could listen to and satisfy some of its opponents' needs, and could on occasion run candidates of undoubted quality, such as Abram Hewitt to oppose Henry George's United Labor Party in 1886. ) In the reported words of the Tammany leader George Washington Plunkitt, reformers were only "mornin' glories —- looked lovely in the mornin' and withered up in a short time, while the regular machines went on flourishin' forever, like fine old oaks.".

Quite apart from Tammany Hall itself, both Republicans and left-wing reform parties have always had to deal with the overwhelmingly Democratic sympathies of New York City's voters. An examination of the election table below will show that neither the various Socialist and labor parties nor the Republicans were ever strong enough to elect a Mayor alone without the support, or at least the benign non-hostility, of other parties and independents.

Fusion, second ballot lines, and third parties
The local term for uniting several constituencies or movements against Tammany was Fusion, which usually required the Republicans to abstain from competing with a non-Republican reform candidate (as in the elections of Seth Low in 1901 and John P. Mitchel in 1913). Later the unusual ability of New York candidates to combine (fuse) votes from several different parties allowed Republicans and Democrats to run their own reform candidates on third party lines, such as "Fusion", American Labor, Liberal, Conservative and Independence. In fact, no Republican has ever been elected Mayor of consolidated New York without the support of at least one other significant party, from LaGuardia to the ex-Democrat Michael Bloomberg. See the Statistical Appendix for other examples.

Even when a candidate could not gain another party's support, they often found it expedient to create a separate line or party name for independent voters to support him, such as "Recovery"  (Joseph V. McKee in 1933), "Anticommunist" (Jeremiah T. Mahoney in 1937), "Experience" (Vincent Impellitteri in 1950) or "Brotherhood" (Robert F. Wagner, Jr. in 1961). In 1965, Rep. John V. Lindsay (R-Liberal) won votes on the "Independent Citizens" line, while his opponent Comptroller Abe Beame (D) won additional votes for "Civil Service Fusion".

Although granting or withholding endorsement was an effective tool for a minor party to influence a candidate's policies and actions, it could sometimes lead to counter-pressure from those who felt that candidates were being swayed too far in the wrong direction. This was one of the main reasons for  founding the Conservative Party of New York in 1962 by those upset at the liberalism of Republican Governor Nelson A. Rockefeller and (later) Lindsay, against whose 1965 Mayoral campaign the Conservatives ran William F. Buckley, Jr.

More recently, there has been a trend of reformers working not through third parties (such as the now-dormant Liberals) but through Reform Democratic clubs, leading to lively internal contests such as the 1989 Democratic primary where David Dinkins unseated incumbent Mayor Edward Koch who started his own political career in a Reform Democratic Club. On the other side, however, dissatisfied conservatives have created their own new parties outside the Republican Party, such as the New York State Right to Life Party and the Independence Party of New York.

Recent elections

2021

Brooklyn Borough President Eric Adams of the Democratic Party defeated Guardian Angels founder Curtis Sliwa, who ran on the Republican and Independent lines by a margin of 441,416 votes or 66.99% against 27.76%. Notable third party candidates included teacher Cathy Rojas of the Party for Socialism and Liberation (2.49%/27,982 votes) and retired police officer Bill Pepitone of the Conservative Party (1.12%/12,575 votes). However, this was ultimately a fairly partisan election by New York City standards with 94% of voters voting on the Democratic and Republican lines. This was likely due to the absence of the Working Families Party from the ballot, who elected not to endorse a candidate and the standalone candidacy of the Conservative Party, who typically garner votes by endorsing the Republican candidate.

2017

Bill de Blasio, the incumbent mayor, won re-election to a second term, on Democratic and Working Families Party lines, over challengers Nicole Malliotakis on the Republican and Conservative party lines, Sal Albanese on the Reform Party line, Akeem Browder on the Green Party line, independent candidates Mike Tolkin and Bo Dietl, and Libertarian Party candidate Aaron Commey.

2013

The principal candidates were Joe Lhota on the Republican and Conservative lines, Bill de Blasio on the Democratic and Working Families lines, and some independents. Bill de Blasio won the election in a landslide

2013 results by borough

Democratic primary election, Tuesday, September 10, 2013

Bill de Blasio, the city's elected Public Advocate, won 40.8% of the total Democratic primary vote and, by exceeding 40.0%, avoided an October 1 primary runoff with Bill Thompson, who won the second-highest number of primary votes, or 26.1%. (In 2009, Thompson had won the Democratic primary only to lose a close general election to Mayor Michael Bloomberg.) Christine Quinn, the Speaker of the New York City Council, came in third, with 15.7%, while none of the other candidates, including City Comptroller John Liu and former Congressman Anthony Weiner, won as much as 10%. De Blasio carried all five boroughs and Thompson came in second in every borough except Manhattan, where he finished third behind Quinn.

From the Board of Elections in the City of New York, September 27, 2013 

Republican primary election, Tuesday, September 10, 2013

In the Republican primary, Joe Lhota, a former deputy mayor and former chairman of the Metropolitan Transportation Authority carried every borough but Staten Island, which was won by John Catsimatidis, a businessman, publisher and property developer. Catsimatidis, in losing, won nearly as large a percentage of his own party's vote (40.69%) as the Democratic winner, Bill de Blasio won of his (40.81%). The 61,111 valid votes cast in the Republican primary were less than one-eleventh of the 691,801 cast in the Democratic one held on the same day in the same polling places.

From the Board of Elections in the City of New York, September 27, 2013

2009

The principal candidates were Mayor Michael Bloomberg, an independent running for the third time on the Republican and Independence Party lines, and New York City Comptroller Bill Thompson, running for the Democratic and Working Families Parties. Bloomberg had enjoyed pluralities of about 9% to 16% in most independent published pre-election polls and on Tuesday, November 3, he won his third term with 50.7% of votes over Thompson's 46%.

Other candidates included:

Steven Christopher of Memorial Baptist Church in Brooklyn, Conservative Party of New York State
Joseph Dobrian, Libertarian Party of New York
Reverend Billy Talen of the Church of Life After Shopping, Green Party of New York
Dan Fein, Socialist Workers Party
Francisca Villar, Party for Socialism and Liberation
Jimmy McMillan, Rent Is Too Damn High Party
Tyrell Eiland, New Voice Party
Jonny Porkpie, independent
John M. Finan, independent

General election, Tuesday, November 3, 2009

Democratic primary, Tuesday, September 15, 2009

From the Board of Elections in the City of New York, September 26, 2009 

Tony Avella represents a Queens district on the New York City Council. Out of the nearly 400 write-in votes, almost half or 184 (representing about one Democratic voter in 2,000) were some form or spelling of Mayor Michael Bloomberg.

2005

In 2005, Mayor Bloomberg won every borough but The Bronx (of which his Democratic opponent was the former Borough President) against a Democratic Party split by a divisive primary, in contrast to his first victory in 2001, when Bloomberg carried only Queens and Staten Island.

Source: Board of Elections in the City of New York http://www.vote.nyc.ny.us/results.html

2001

The 2001 mayoral election was held on Tuesday, November 6.

Republican incumbent Rudy Giuliani could not run again due to term limits. As Democrats outnumber Republicans by 5 to 1 in the city, it was widely believed that a Democrat would succeed him in City Hall. However, billionaire Michael Bloomberg, a lifelong Democrat, changed his party affiliation a few months before the election in order to avoid a crowded primary, and ran as a Republican. The Democratic primary was meant to be held on September 11 but was postponed due to the September 11 attacks; it was instead held on September 25. The primary opened the way to a bitter run-off between the Bronx-born Puerto Rican Fernando Ferrer, and Mark J. Green, a non-Hispanic who attacked Ferrer's close ties to Rev. Al Sharpton, leaving the party divided along racial lines.

Bloomberg spent $74 million on his election campaign, which was a record amount at the time for a non-presidential election (Bloomberg would break his own record in 2005).  Thanks also in part to active support from Giuliani, whose approval ratings shot up after the September 11 attacks, Bloomberg won a very close general election.

1997

Notes:
Giuliani vote was 748,277 Republican and 35,538 Liberal.
Other vote was Sal Albanese -Independence-14,316 1.1%; Peter Gaffney-Right to Life-5,304 0.5%; Olga Rodriguez-Socialist Workers-3,753 0.3%; Dominick Fusco-Fusion- 632; Scattered 293
In the Democratic Primary, Messinger defeated Rev. Al Sharpton, Sal Albanese and 2 others, avoiding a runoff election.
The vote was: Messenger-165,377 40.2%; Sharpton-131,848 32.0%; Albanese-86,485 21.0%; Eric Melendez-17,633 4.3%; Roland Rogers-10,086 2.5%

Past elections

1993

| ||||||||||||

Giuliani vote included 867,767 Republican and 62,469 Liberal. Marlin vote included 9,433 Conservative and 6,493 Right to Life.
In addition, there were 2,229 votes for J. Brennan-Libertarian; 2,061 votes for M. Bockman - Socialist Workers and 117 Scattered votes.

Dinkins won Democratic Primary with 336,285 votes to 126,449 for Roy Innis and 35,492 for Eric Melendez

1989

| ||||||||||||||

Giuliani vote was 815,387 Republican and 55,077 Liberal.

Other vote was 1,732 Lenora Fulani-New Alliance; 1,671-James Harris-Socialist Workers; 1,118 Warren Raum-Libertarian; 435 Mazelis-Workers League.

|}Giuliani won the Republican Primary, defeating Ron Lauder 77,150 (67.0%) to 37,960 (33.0%)

1985

The Koch vote include 862,226 Democratic and 6,034 Independent votes. The McGrath vote was 79,508 Republican and 22,160 Conservative.
Other vote was: Yehuda Levin - Right to Life - 14,517; Lenora Fulani - New Alliance - 7,597;Jarvis Tyner - People Before Profits - 3,370; Andrea Gonzalez - Socialist Workers - 1,677; Gilbert DiLucia - Coalition - 1,135; Marjorie Stanberg - Spartacist - 1,101; Scattered - 9

Koch won the Democratic Primary: Koch-436,151 64.0%; Bellamy - 127,690 18.7%; Denny Farrell - 89,845 13.2%; DiLucia - 11, 627 1.7%; Fred Newman - 8,584 1.2%;
Judah Rubenstein - 8,057 1.2%

1981

Koch had 738,288 Democratic votes and 174,334 Republican votes.
Others = 45,485. Jeronimo Dominguez - Right to Life - 32,790 2.7%; Judith Jones - Libertarian - 6,902 0.6%; Wells Todd - Socialist Workers - 5,793 0.5%
Koch won the Democratic Primary with 347,351 votes (59.8%), defeating Barbaro who had 209,369 votes (36.0%) and Melvin Klenetsky who had 24,352 votes (4.2%). Koch also won the Republican Primary, defeating Esposito by 44,724 to 22,354.

1977

In his 2005 book Ladies and Gentlemen, The Bronx Is Burning, historian Jonathan Mahler argues that the New York City blackout of 1977, with its accompanying rioting, enabled the law-and-order advocate Ed Koch to beat out his more left-wing opponents, including incumbent mayor Abe Beame, in the 1977 election.

Other vote was: Kenneth F. Newcombe - Communist - 5,300; Catarino Garza - Socialist Workers - 3,294; Vito Battista - United Taxpayers Party - 2,119; Louis Wein - Independent - 1,127; William Lawry - Free Libertarian - 1,068; Elijah Boyd - Labor - 873. Cuomo's total vote included 522,942 Liberal and 64,971 Neighborhood Government.

 
Runoff-Koch-433,002 55.0%; Cuomo-354,833 45.0% Total vote 787,835
Manhattan-Koch-115,251 65.2%; Cuomo—61,570 34.8%
Bronx-----Koch-69,612 55.7%; Cuomo—55,355 44.3%
Brooklyn—Koch-131,271 53.8%; Cuomo—112,587 46.2%
Queens----Koch-107,033 50.4%; Cuomo—105,522 49.6%
Staten----Koch-9,835 33.1%; Cuomo—19,799 66.9%

Note that the eventual winner, Rep. Ed Koch, could not win a plurality in any of the Five Boroughs for the initial Democratic primary. Rep. Bella Abzug took Manhattan, Mayor Abe Beame Brooklyn, Rep. Herman Badillo the Bronx, and NY Sec. of State Mario Cuomo Queens & Staten Island. In the Democratic run-off with Cuomo, Koch took Queens and three other boroughs, leaving Cuomo with only Staten Island. In the general election, Cuomo kept Staten Island and won back Queens, but lost the other three boroughs (Manhattan, Brooklyn and The Bronx) to Koch.

In the Republican primary, Roy M. Goodman, a member of the New York State Senate, defeated Barry Farber, a radio commentator, by a vote of 41,131 to 31,078(57.0% to 43.0%). Farber, however, won the nomination of the Conservative Party of New York and won almost as many votes in the general election (57,437 or 4.0%) as Goodman did as the Republican nominee (58,606 or 4.1%).

1929 to 1973

Some figures and anecdotes courtesy James Trager's New York Chronology (HarperCollins: 2003). Other numbers are from The World Almanac and Book of Facts, then published by The New York World-Telegram (Scripps-Howard), for 1943 (page 412) and 1957 (page 299), and from The Encyclopedia of New York City (see Sources below).

Before 1975, the present Borough of Staten Island was formally known as The Borough of Richmond.

1973

note: All the candidates except Marchi had run in the Democratic primary. Candidates votes on their second ballot lines included above were: Beame-Civil Service & Fusion -67,277; Marchi-Integrity - 14,271; Blumenthal - Good Government - 29, 335; Biaggi - Safe City - 8,010. Other vote includes 8,818 Fran Youngstein - Free Libertarian Party; 3,601 Rasheed Storey - Communist; 2,282 Norman Oliver - Socialist Workers; 2,000 Anton Chaiken -Labor; 1,762 John Emanuel - Socialist Labor

1969

Note: In one of the most unusual primary seasons since the conglomeration of greater New York, the incumbent Mayor (Lindsay) and a former incumbent (Robert F. Wagner Jr.) both lost their parties' primaries. Procaccino won with less than 33% of the vote against four opponents, which inspired the use of runoffs in future primaries. In the general election, Lindsay carried Manhattan (the only borough he had carried in losing the Republican primary to Marchi, 107,000 to 113,000) as he did in 1965, but he was only 4,000 votes ahead of giving first place in Queens to Procaccino. Turnout dropped to 2.4 million from 2.6 million in 1965. (In the same election, Lindsay's 1965 opponent Abe Beame was easily returned to his old job of comptroller.)

The New York Mets' unlikely win in the 1969 World Series and Mayor Lindsay's participation in their postgame celebration may have given the Mayor a late public relations boost which contributed to his victory.

 The Lindsay vote was 872,660 Liberal (36.5%) and 139,973 Independent (5.9%). 
 Procaccino's vote was 774,708 Democratic (32.4%) and 57,064 Civil Service Fusion (2.4%).
 The Marchi vote was 329,506 Republican (13.8%) and 212,905 Conservative (8.9%).
 By themselves, the straight Democratic and Republican lines added up to less than 50% of the mayoral vote (1,104,214 or 46.2%), but more than the total vote for Lindsay (1,012,633 or 42.4%).
 Procaccino's general election votes on the Democratic line alone (774,708) were slightly fewer than the total votes received by all candidates in the Democratic primary (777,796).
 Lindsay's general election votes on the Liberal line alone (872,660) exceeded Procaccino's total votes on all lines (831,772).

1965

Almost a quarter of Lindsay's vote (281,796) was on the Liberal Party line, while 63,590 of Beame's votes were on the Civil Service Fusion line. John Lindsay, a Republican Congressman from the "Silk-Stocking" District on the Upper East Side of Manhattan, carried Manhattan, Queens, and traditionally Republican Staten Island (Richmond), while Abe Beame, the city comptroller, carried The Bronx and his home borough of Brooklyn, both of which he had also won in the Democratic primary. However, while Beame had also carried Queens in the primary, he lost it to Lindsay in the general election. (Five years later, Bill Buckley's brother James L. Buckley would win the 1970 New York state election for U.S. Senator on the Conservative Party line against divided opposition.) The Other vote was 11,104- Vito Battista - United Taxpayer Party; 3,977- Clifton DeBerry - Socialist Workers; 2,087 - Eric Haas - Socialist Labor

1961

Mayor Wagner broke with the regular Democratic organization which had supported him in 1953 and 1957, defeating their candidate, Arthur Levitt, in the Democratic primary 61% to 39%. At the same time, after running successfully with Lawrence Gerosa for Comptroller in the previous two elections, Wagner chose to run instead with Abraham Beame in 1961. Gerosa ran against Wagner for mayor as the "real Democrat" on a pro-taxpayer platform. 211,000 of Wagner's 1,237,000 votes came on the Liberal Party line, and 55,000 on the purpose-built Brotherhood line.

Other vote was: Vito Battista - United Taxpayers Party - 19,960; Richard Garza - Socialist Workers - 7,037; Eric Haas - Socialist Labor - 3,272

1957

Other vote was:
 Joyce Cowley - Socialist Workers - 13,453 0.6%; Eric Haas - Socialist Labor- 4,611 0.2%

1953

Total vote was 2,207,516
Other vote was David L. Weiss-Socialist Workers-2,054 (0.1%);Nathan Karp-Industrial Government-916; Scattered-180.
"Industrial Government" is a ballot title sometimes used, to avoid confusion or to meet election laws, by the Socialist Labor Party. The Liberal Party of New York won over five times as many votes as the American Labor Party in Manhattan, and eight-to-ten times as many in the other boroughs. The ALP lost its ballot status after the 1954 Governor's race, and voted to dissolve itself in 1956.

1950

Vincent Impellitteri, the mayor who succeeded mid-term after William O'Dwyer resigned on August 31, 1950, swept Manhattan, Queens and Staten Island in this special election, while Ferdinand Pecora (aided by the Liberal Party) took very narrow leads in The Bronx and Brooklyn. In this election, the Liberals heavily outpolled the American Labor Party in every borough but Manhattan and Staten Island, where the two parties' votes were almost equal.

1949

Other vote was: Eric Haas - Industrial Government - 7,857; Joseph G. Glass - Socialist - 3,396; Michael Bartell - Socialist Workers - 1,224. The Morris vote was 570,713 Republican, 373,287 Liberal and 12,069 Fusion

1945

O'Dwyer received 867,426 Democratic votes and 257,929 on the American Labor Party line. The Goldstein vote was 301,144 Republican, 122,316 Liberal and 8,141 City Fusion.
The No Deal Party (according to Chris McNickle in The Encyclopedia of New York City) was founded by the retiring maverick Republican Mayor Fiorello La Guardia to draw Republican votes towards Newbold Morris and away from the official Republican Party with whom La Guardia was having a dispute. The No Deal Party dissolved soon after the 1945 election. Newbold Morris was a Republican, while Jonah Goldstein was a Democrat until nomination day.
Other vote was: Joseph G. Glass - Socialist - 9,304; Farrell Dobbs - Trotskyist Anti-War - 3,656; Eric Hass - Socialist Labor - 3,465; Max Shachtman - Workers - 585; Scattered - 45.

1941

As in 1937, more voters in every borough voted on the Democratic line than on any other single line; but this time (unlike 1937) the Democrat carried Queens and Staten Island over La Guardia, shrinking the Mayor's overall citywide percentage lead from 20% to 6%. As in 1937, La Guardia's overall margin of victory depended on the American Labor Party, which again won more votes than the Republicans in The Bronx. While the total vote and Republican vote were almost identical in 1937 and 1941, the ALP line lost 47,000 votes (2.4%), almost entirely from Manhattan (-18,000) and Brooklyn (-26,000), as the vote on La Guardia's other lines (Fusion, Progressive and United City) dropped from 187,000 (8.3%) to 86,000 (3.7%). The Democratic Party gained about 160,000 votes lost by La Guardia (and about 7½% of the total). In both Queens and Richmond (Staten Island), the swing was even greater: La Guardia lost over 15% of the total vote (and the Democrats gained over 15%) from 1937, as his lead there flipped from roughly 56%-44% to 39%-60%.

1937

Note that the leading line in every borough, and in the City as a whole, is the Democratic line for Judge Mahoney. Running on the Republican line alone (as he did when losing the election of 1929), Mayor La Guardia would have lost every borough, but he carried all five when the American Labor Party line was added. The ALP line did better than the Republican line in The Bronx, although worse than the Democratic one.
There were also 2,307 votes for Emil Teichert on the Industrial Government line.

1933

The 1933 LaGuardia vote was 446,833 Republican and 421,689 City Fusion. The O'Brien vote was 570,937 Democratic and 15,735 Jeffersonian.
There were also 1,778 votes for Henry Klein-Five Cent Fare & Taxpayers; 472 for Aaron Orange - Socialist Labor; and 118 for Adolph Silver - Independent Union.

Collapse of the Socialist Party vote

In 1933, a year that might otherwise have favored the Socialist Party's chances, the New Deal began, Morris Hillquit died, Norman Thomas refused to run again for mayor, and the Socialist vote (previously as high as one-eighth to one-fifth of the total) collapsed irretrievably from a quarter of a million to sixty thousand (one-thirtieth of the total). Many supporters of Thomas's 1929 campaign defected (some, like Paul Blanshard, also leaving the Party) to support Fiorello La Guardia. By the time of the next mayoral election in 1937, which the Socialist Party decided by internal referendum not to contest, many reformers and trade-unionists who wanted to support major-party progressives like La Guardia (R-ALP-Fusion), Gov. Herbert Lehman (D-ALP) and Pres. Franklin D. Roosevelt (D-ALP) from outside the two-party structure backed the American Labor Party (ALP), the Social Democratic Federation and later the Liberal Party of New York. After a disastrous gubernatorial campaign in 1938 (where Thomas and George Hartmann won only 25,000 votes out of over 4.7 million), the Socialist Party lost its separate line on the New York ballot, allowed its members to join the ALP, and indeed encouraged them to do so. In 1939, the Socialist Harry W. Laidler, a co-founder of the Intercollegiate Socialist Society and League for Industrial Democracy, was elected (with the help of proportional representation) to the New York City Council on the ALP's ticket, but lost its renomination two years later because of rivalry with the Communists. 
[Although not apparent from the table below, the Communist Party's vote for other municipal offices, such as City Council and President of the Board of Aldermen, was increasing at the same time that the Socialist Party's was declining below the Communists'. But in 1936, when the foundation of the ALP coincided with world Communism's shift from independent action towards the Popular Front, New York City Communists redirected much of their own energy towards supporting the ALP.] 

[Click on the year for fuller details. ALP = American Labor Party (see commentary above). Socialist Labor Party candidates and votes not retrievable for every year from the sources used for this article. Readers are encouraged to supply any missing details.]

† In 1894 and in 1897, Lucien Sanial was the mayoral candidate of the Socialist Labor Party before both the SLP and the Social Democratic Party each split in two. In 1901, one faction of the SLP, led by Morris Hillquit, and one faction of the SDP, led by Eugene V. Debs, united to form the Socialist Party of America, which soon drew away many votes formerly cast for the SLP.

1932

Totals after a court-ordered recount:

Joseph V. McKee, as the (popularly elected) President of the Board of Aldermen, became Acting Mayor upon the resignation of elected Mayor Jimmy Walker on September 1, 1932. McKee's write-in total is, in fact, the highest any New York City election would ever see. For the election after the next one, voting machines which would make write-in voting much more difficult were introduced. Machines of this basic design are still being used.

Lewis Humphrey Pounds was President of the Borough of Brooklyn from June 1913 to December 1917.

This was the last of many campaigns for different offices by Morris Hillquit, a co-founder of the Socialist Party of America, who died in 1933. Hillquit had won over 21% of the vote for mayor in 1917.

Borough returns before the recount (which did not significantly affect the outcome):

There were also 24,014 votes 1.2% for William Patterson - Communist and 11,379 0.5% for Olive Johnson - Socialist Labor

1929

There were also 5,805 votes for William Weinstone - Communist and 320 votes for Lawrence Tracy - Commonwealth Land.
The great stock market crash hit Wall Street on October 24–29, 1929, less than two weeks before Election Day. Richard Edward Enright was New York City Police Commissioner from 1918 to 1925.

1897 to 1925

¶ Basic numbers for the elections of 1897 to 1925 come from The World Almanac and Book of Facts for 1929 and 1943. Percentages and borough totals calculated independently. (Because of some anomalies, not all columns and rows add precisely.) First names and informational links gathered from Wikipedia and several external sources, including the free public archive of The New York Times.

1925

Mayor Hylan, an ally of the newspaper publisher William Randolph Hearst, was unseated in a venomous Democratic primary by "Gentleman" Jimmy Walker, the Democratic party leader in the New York State Senate, who had been recruited to oppose Hylan by Hearst's inveterate enemy, Democratic Governor Al Smith. After the death of Tammany Hall leader Charles F. Murphy in 1924, the regular Democratic organizations also split their allegiances, with Hylan receiving support from John McCooey, the leader in Brooklyn, and Walker from Ed Flynn of the Bronx. (Hearst had run for mayor on third-party tickets in 1905 and 1909, while Al Smith had lost a bid for the Democratic nomination for mayor in 1917, instead winning the presidency of the New York City Council as Hylan's running-mate.)

1921

Henry Curran was the borough president of Manhattan and heavily defeated Fiorello H. La Guardia, president of the board of aldermen, in the Republican primary election for mayor. There was also 454 votes for Joseph Miller on the Single Tax Line and 443 votes for Benjamin Gitlow on the Workers League Line

1917

Notes: The Single Tax on land values was the proposal and platform of Henry George, who ran for mayor in 1897 and 1886. D. Leigh Colvin later contested the U.S. presidential election of 1936 for the Prohibition Party.

The Fall 1917 election would have been exciting even had it occurred in peacetime. In September, the City held its first-ever primary elections for mayor. The sitting independent Mayor, John P. Mitchel, who had enjoyed Republican support under Fusion in 1913, narrowly lost the Republican primary to William Bennett, after mistakes and frauds led to a series of recounts. When negotiations between the parties failed, Mitchel ran alone as a Fusion candidate against Bennett, the Socialist Morris Hillquit and John F. Hylan, the regular Democrat supported by Tammany Hall and William Randolph Hearst.

However, the elections happened after the United States had declared war on April 6. Hillquit and the Socialist Party quickly and vigorously opposed the war, which Mitchel vigorously supported. Hillquit's anti-war position helped the Socialists win their highest-ever vote for mayor, but also led to vitriolic denunciations by many, including The New York Times and former President Theodore Roosevelt. Mitchel and Hillquit each won less than quarter of the vote, while Hylan, who had been non-committal about the war, won the election with less than half the vote. However, as in 1897, the numbers suggest that Tammany Hall might have won even against a unified opposition.

1897 to 1913

¶ The Bronx and Manhattan, although separate Boroughs since 1898, shared New York County and reported their votes together until Bronx County was formed in April 1912 and came into its separate existence on January 1, 1914.

[ The World Almanac does not list separate returns for the two boroughs until 1917, but The Encyclopedia of New York City (see Sources) gives these major candidates' results for 1913: 
 Manhattan: McCall 103,429 - Mitchel 131,280, and The Bronx: McCall 25,684 - Mitchel 46,944. ]

Mayor William Jay Gaynor, who had survived being shot in the throat by a disappointed office-seeker in 1910, died at sea from the indirect effects of his injury on September 10, 1913. He was succeeded for the rest of 1913 by Ardolph Loges Kline, the acting president of the board of aldermen. 

The election of 1897 was held just before the Five Boroughs formally consolidated into Greater New York in 1898, so it was the present city's first mayoral election. For preliminary results for all the municipal offices, broken down into smaller districts, see "Democrats Take All - The Tammany Ticket Makes Almost a Clean Sweep of the Greater City - Only Two Republicans in the Council..." in The New York Times, November 4, 1897 (seen April 11, 2008).

† Henry George, author of Progress and Poverty and proponent of the Single Tax on land, died (probably from the strain of campaign speeches) on October 29, four days before Election Day; his son was nominated to take his place representing "The Democracy of Thomas Jefferson". 
[In 1886, George had been the United Labor Party's candidate for Mayor of the smaller City of New York, now the Borough of Manhattan, winning 68,110 votes to 90,552 for the Democrat Abram Hewitt and 60,435 for the Republican Theodore Roosevelt, although George's supporters maintained that he had lost the election through fraud.] 

It appears from the percentages to be an open question whether the Republican Party's decision in 1897 not to support Seth Low's Fusion campaign caused his defeat by splitting the vote against Tammany Hall. Republicans withdrew in Low's favor in 1901 (when he won) and in 1903 (when he lost).

See also
Mayor of New York City
List of mayors of New York City
History of New York City
Government of New York City
Politics of New York (state)
Elections in New York (State)
Tammany Hall
American Labor Party
Liberal Party of New York
Conservative Party of New York State
Independence Party of New York
Working Families Party
Green Party of New York
Libertarian Party of New York
New York City: the 51st State (a municipal political slate in 1969)
1886 New York City mayoral election

References

Sources

Many sources have been consulted and compared, but the most important ones are these:

[2001-2009] The Board of Elections in the City of New York — http://www.vote.nyc.ny.us/results.html
[1997] , pages 815-816;  Cable News Network (CNN), 1997: http://www.cnn.com/ALLPOLITICS/1997/gen/resources/election97/results.html
[1834-1993] The Encyclopedia of New York City (1st edition), edited by Kenneth T. Jackson (Yale University Press and The New York Historical Society, New Haven, Connecticut, 1995), especially the article "Mayoralty" by Charles W. Brecher with tables compiled by James Bradley
[1929-1973] The New York Chronology by James Trager (HarperCollins, 2003) More details and preview available at https://books.google.com/books?id=xvGhQoNT27IC
[1950-1953] The World Almanac and Book of Facts, 1957, page 299
[1909-1941] The World Almanac and Book of Facts, 1943, page 412
[1897-1925] The World Almanac and Book of Facts, 1929 (1971 reprint by American Heritage and Workman Publishing), page 893
[1867-1923 and later] The New York Times archives